A leadership election for Christian and Democratic Union – Czechoslovak People's Party (KDU-ČSL) was held on 27 May 2017. Pavel Bělobrádek was reelected leader of KDU-ČSL. He received 227 votes of 270 delegates. His rival Jiří Čunek received 43 votes. Čunek announced his candidature on the day of the election. His candidature was speculated for months prior the election.

References

KDU-ČSL leadership elections
2017 elections in the Czech Republic
Indirect elections
Christian and Democratic Union - Czechoslovak People's Party leadership election